No. 1 Group of the Royal Air Force is one of the two operations groups in RAF Air Command. Today, the group is referred to as the Air Combat Group, as it controls the RAF's combat fast-jet aircraft and has airfields in the UK, as well as RAF Support Unit Goose Bay in Canada. The group headquarters is located alongside Headquarters Air Command at RAF High Wycombe, Buckinghamshire. The other operational group is No. 2 Group RAF.

The current Air Officer Commanding No 1 Group is Air Vice-Marshal Mark Robert Flewin, who took up the post in January 2023.

Subordinate units
The following stations and squadrons are under the command of No. 1 Group:
 RAF Coningsby
No. 3(Fighter) Squadron with Typhoon FGR4
 No. XI(F) Squadron with Typhoon FGR4
 No. 12 Squadron with Typhoon FGR4
 No. 29 Squadron with Typhoon FGR4 Operational conversion unit (OCU)
 Battle of Britain Memorial Flight
 RAF Leeming
 Joint Forward Air Controller Training and Standards Unit
 RAF Lossiemouth
 No. 1(F) Squadron with Typhoon FGR4
 No. II(Army Co-operation) Squadron with Typhoon FGR4
 No. 6 Squadron with Typhoon FGR4
 No. IX(Bomber) Squadron with Typhoon Tranche 1/FGR4
 No. 120 Squadron with Poseidon MRA1
 No. 201 Squadron with Poseidon MRA1
 No. 602 (City of Glasgow) Squadron (Royal Auxiliary Air Force) – Moray Flight
 RAF Marham
 No. 207 Squadron with F-35B Lightning (OCU)
 No. 617 Squadron with F-35B Lightning
 RAF Waddington
 No. 8 Squadron formerly with Sentry AEW1 (withdrawn from service 2021; to re-equip with E-7A Wedgetail and reform at RAF Lossiemouth starting in 2024)
 No. 13 Squadron with MQ-9A Reaper
 No. 14 Squadron with Shadow R1
 No. 39 Squadron with MQ-9A Reaper
 No. 51 Squadron with RC-135W Airseeker
 No. 54 Squadron ISTAR crews Operational Conversion Unit (OCU) on multiple types of Intelligence, Surveillance and Reconnaissance (ISR) aircraft
 No. 1 Intelligence, Surveillance, and Reconnaissance Wing

History

First World War
No. 1 Group was originally formed on Saturday 1 April 1918 in No. 1 Area, which was renamed the South-Eastern Area on 8 May 1918, Southern Area on 20 September 1919 and Inland Area on 1 April 1920.

The Group was renumbered as No. 6 Group on 19 May 1924 at RAF Kenley, and was reformed on the same day at RAF Kidbrooke. Two years later on 12 April 1926 the Group disappeared from the order of battle by being renumbered as No. 21 Group.

The next year the Group was reformed on 25 August 1927 by the renaming of Air Defence Group. This designation lasted until 1936 when it became No. 6 Group again. As in 1924 the Group was reformed the same day, this time as a bomber formation.

By this time the Group had shrunk to ten squadrons, all equipped with Fairey Battle aircraft and located in pairs at RAF Abingdon, RAF Harwell, RAF Benson, RAF Boscombe Down and RAF Bicester.

Second World War

On receipt of orders to move to France in 1939, Headquarters No. 1 Group became Headquarters Advanced Air Striking Force and the station headquarters and associated squadrons became Nos. 71, 72, 74, 75 and 76 Wings respectively. The Group re-emerged a few days later within Bomber Command on 12 September, but only lasted just over three months, being dropped on 22 December 1939.

It was reformed at Hucknall in Nottinghamshire on 22 June 1940. On 20 July the Group Headquarters moved to Bawtry Hall (RAF Bawtry) near Doncaster, where it was based for 44 years, until 1983. During the Second World War, the Group was primarily based at airfields in north Lincolnshire, like RAF Swinderby.

During 1940–45, the group included substantial numbers of Polish and Royal Australian Air Force (RAAF) personnel. By the beginning of March 1943, the aircraft operated by its squadrons were:
 Vickers Wellington: 166 & 199 Sqns RAF, and 300 Polish, 301 Polish & 305 Polish Sqns.  
 Avro Lancaster: 12, 100, 101, 150 & 103 Sqns RAF, and 460 Sqn RAAF.
All of the Wellington squadrons subsequently converted to Lancasters. No. 1 Group was later augmented with other units, including 304 Polish Squadron.

During Bomber Command's Second World War campaign, No. 1 Group dropped a higher tonnage of bombs per aircraft than any other group, this was mainly due to Air Commodore Edward Rice who was determined to maximise bomb loads, though it was a policy which contributed in no small measure to No. 1 Group having higher than average losses. Rice would later be involved in the development of the Rose turret, sometimes known as the "Rose-Rice turret".

Battle of Normandy 
Although No.1 (B) Group wasn't directly involved in the Battle of Normandy, they did participate in the bombing of the shore and area. During this period, the group was organised as:

 No. 1 (B) Group HQ, RAF Bawtry, West Yorkshire
 RAF Hemswell
 Station HQ
 No. 1 Lancaster Finishing School (training with Lancaster I/III)
 Night Bomber Tactical School
150 Squadron Lancaster Mrk I (C flight from 550 Squadron)
 RAF Ingham (satellite of RAF Hemswell)
 Station HQ
 No. 1481 (Bomber) Gunnery Flight RAF equipped with Wellington III and Miles Martinet
 No. 1687 Bomber (Defence) Training Flight RAF equipped with Supermarine Spitfire & Hawker Hurricane
 RAF Sturgate (satellite of RAF Hemswell)
 No. 11 Base
 RAF Lindholme Station HQ
 No. 1656 Heavy Conversion Unit RAF, RAF Lindholme equipped with Avro Lancaster I/III
 No. 1662 Heavy Conversion Unit RAF, RAF Blyton equipped with Avro Lancaster I/III & Handley Page Halifax II/V
 No. 1667 Heavy Conversion Unit RAF, RAF Sandtoft equipped with Handley Page Halifax V
 No. 1 Group Servicing Section, RAF Lindholme
 No. 12 Base
RAF Binbrook Station HQ
 No. 100 Squadron RAF, RAF Grimsby equipped with Avro Lancaster I/III
No. 9100 Servicing Echelon
 No. 460 Squadron RAAF, RAF Binbrook equipped with Avro Lancaster I/III
No. 9460 Servicing Echelon
 No. 625 Squadron RAF, RAF Kelstern, equipped with Avro Lancaster I/III
 No. 9625 Servicing Echelon
 No. 1 Ground Gunnery School, RAF Binbrook
No. 13 Base
RAF Elsham Wolds Station HQ
No. 103 Squadron RAF, RAF Elsham Wolds equipped with Avro Lancaster I/III
No. 9103 Servicing Echelon
No. 166 Squadron RAF, RAF Kirmington equipped with Avro Lancaster I/III
No. 9166 Servicing Echelon
No. 550 Squadron RAF, RAF North Killingholme equipped with Avro Lancaster I/III
No. 9550 Servicing Echelon
No. 576 Squadron RAF, RAF Elsham Wolds equipped with Avro Lancaster I/III
No. 9576 Servicing Echelon
No.14 Base
RAF Ludford Magna Station HQ
No. 12 Squadron RAF, RAF Wickenby equipped with Avro Lancaster I/III
No. 9012 Servicing Echelon
No. 101 Squadron RAF, RAF Ludford Magna equipped with Avro Lancaster I/III
No. 9101 Servicing Echelon
No. 300 Polish Bomber Squadron, RAF Faldingworth with Avro Lancaster I/III
No. 9300 Servicing Echelon
No. 626 Squadron RAF, RAF Wickenby equipped with Avro Lancaster I/III
No. 9626 Servicing Echelon

Cold War

By June 1948, 1 Group consisted of:
 9 Sqn, RAF Binbrook, Avro Lincoln B.2
 12 Sqn, RAF Binbrook, Lincoln B.2
 101 Sqn, RAF Binbrook, Lincoln B.2
 617 Sqn, RAF Binbrook, Lincoln B.2
 83 Sqn, RAF Hemswell, Lincoln B.2
 97 Sqn, RAF Hemswell, Lincoln B.2
 100 Sqn, RAF Hemswell, Lincoln B.2
 50 Sqn, RAF Waddington, Lincoln B.2
 57 Sqn, RAF Waddington, Lincoln B.2
 61 Sqn, RAF Waddington, Lincoln B.2
 109 Sqn, RAF Coningsby, de Havilland Mosquito B.35
 139 Sqn, RAF Coningsby, Mosquito B.35

During the Cold War, No. 1 Group also operated the Thor ballistic missile between 1958 and August 1963 ("Project Emily"), with ten squadrons each with three missiles being equipped with the weapon. 1 Group had two sets of five stations, centred respectively on Hemswell and RAF Driffield. When Bomber Command was subsumed into the new Strike Command on 1 April 1968, No. 1 Group took on the old role of the command, directing the bomber and strike aircraft of Strike Command. 

On 17 November 1983, No. 38 Group RAF was subsumed within Headquarters No. 1 Group. 

In around 1984, Headquarters No. 1 Group moved from RAF Bawtry in South Yorkshire to RAF Upavon in Wiltshire. No. 207 Squadron RAF, part of 1 Group flying Devons from RAF Northolt alongside No. 32 Squadron RAF, was disbanded on retirement of the remaining Devons on 30 June 1984.

After the end of the Cold War, RAF Germany was reduced in status to become No. 2 Group RAF. 2 Group was then disbanded by being absorbed into No. 1 Group on 1 April 1996. 2 Group was then reformed on 7 January 2000, splitting out of 1 Group. 1 Group transferred over the RAF's air transport, air-to-air refuelling and airborne early warning functions.

Post 2000

In January 2000 the RAF was restructured and the Group took on its present role. The Group is responsible for UK air defence operations through QRA North at RAF Lossiemouth and QRA South at RAF Coningsby. However, since the disestablishment of Combined Air Operations Centre 9 at RAF High Wycombe, actual control of the fighters is now carried out from a NATO Combined Air Operations Centre in Denmark, CAOC 1 at Finderup. However, High Wycombe retains an air defence direction capability, and the UK Representative there could take back control over QRA South if it was necessary to respond to a terrorist threat from the air. No. 1 Group also has responsibility for the UK's Carrier Strike capability, with the joint RN/RAF Lightning Force, eventually planned to consist of two squadrons from the RAF and two from the Fleet Air Arm, which will be based at RAF Marham when not operating from the UK's .

Air Officer Commanding
Air Officers Commanding have included:

See also
 List of Royal Air Force groups
 List of Army Air Corps aircraft units

References

Citations

Bibliography

Wing Commander C. G. Jefford, MBE, RAF Squadrons; A Comprehensive Record of the Movement and Equipment of all RAF Squadrons and their Antecedents since 1912.1994: Airlife Publishing Ltd., Shrewsbury, United Kingdom. .

External links
 No 1 Group at Royal Air Force Website
 Air of Authority – No 1 Group
 No 1 Group

001
Military units and formations established in 1918
Military units and formations of the Royal Air Force in World War I
1918 establishments in the United Kingdom
Bawtry
Bomber aircraft units and formations of the Royal Air Force